Sărmășag is a commune in Sălaj County, Crișana, Romania.

Geography and climate
The commune's altitude is low, between  160m and 379m. The climate is continental, the average temperature in January is  -3 °C, in July 21.1 °C. The average annually precipitation is about 627mm. The most important fossil fuel is the area is coal. The commune is composed of six villages: Ilișua (Selymesilosva), Lompirt (Szilágylompért), Moiad (Mojád), Poiana Măgura (Magurahegy), Sărmășag and Țărmure (Parttanya).

History
Sărmășag was already inhabited in the Iron Age. The first written documents date back to 1355. The name of the locality probably comes from László Sarmassághy who received the town from the Báthory family .

Demographics
As of the census of 2002 there were 6,547 people residing in the town.

The ethnic makeup of the commune was 5,168 Hungarians, 1,156 Romanians, 217 Romani, 4 Ukrainians, and one German.

Religious beliefs:

Reformed - 4,635
Romanian Orthodox - 1,164
Roman Catholic - 426
Baptist - 232
Greek Catholic - 25
Pentecostal - 13
Evangelical - 2

Sights 
 Reformed church in Lompirt (built in the 18th century)
 Reformed church in Ilișua (built in the 15th century)
 Reformed church in Sărmășag (built 1806j
 St. Nicholas Church in Moiad (c. 1936)

Sister cities
  Soltvadkert, Hungary

References

Communes in Sălaj County
Localities in Crișana